The opioid epidemic, also referred to as the opioid crisis, is the rapid increase in the overuse, misuse/abuse, and overdose deaths attributed either in part or in whole to the class of drugs opiates/opioids since the 1990s. It includes the significant medical, social, psychological, and economic consequences of the medical, non-medical, and recreational abuse of these medications.

Opioids are a diverse class of moderate to strong painkillers, including oxycodone (commonly sold under the trade names OxyContin and Percocet), hydrocodone (Vicodin, Norco), and fentanyl, which is a very strong painkiller that is synthesized to resemble other opiates such as opium-derived morphine and heroin. The potency and availability of these substances, despite the potential risk of addiction and overdose, have made them popular both as medical treatments and as recreational drugs. Due to the sedative effects of opioids on the respiratory center of the medulla oblongata, opioids in high doses present the potential for respiratory depression and may cause respiratory failure and death.

Opioids are highly effective for treating acute pain, but there is strong debate over whether they are effective in treating chronic or high impact intractable pain, as the risks may outweigh the benefits.

United States 

From 1999 to 2016 it is estimated 453,300 Americans have died from opioid use. What the U.S. Surgeon General dubbed "The Opioid Crisis" was theorized to have been caused by the over-prescription of opioids in the 1990s, which led to the CDC Guideline for Prescribing Opioids for Chronic Pain, 2016 and the resulting impact on medical access to prescription opioids "outside of active cancer treatment, palliative and end of life." Opioids initiated for post-surgical pain management have long been debated as one of the causative factors in the opioid crisis, with misuse/abuse estimated at 4.3% of people continuing opioid use after trauma or surgery.

When people continue to use opioids beyond what a doctor prescribes, or when opioids are over-prescribed, whether to minimize pain or induce euphoric feelings, it can mark the beginning stages of an opiate addiction, with a tolerance developing and eventually leading to dependence, when a person relies on the drug to prevent withdrawal symptoms. Writers have pointed to a widespread desire among the public to find a pill for any problem, even if a better solution might be a lifestyle change, such as exercise, improved diet, and stress reduction.  Opioids are relatively inexpensive, and alternative interventions, such as physical therapy, may not be affordable.

In the late 1990s, around 100 million people or a third of the U.S. population were estimated to be affected by chronic pain. This led to a push by drug companies and the federal government to expand the use of painkilling opioids. In addition to this, initiatives like the Joint Commission began to push for more attentive physician response to patient pain, referring to pain as the fifth vital sign. This exacerbated the already increasing number of opioids being prescribed by doctors to patients. Between 1991 and 2011, painkiller prescriptions in the U.S. tripled from 76 million to 219 million per year, and as of 2016 more than 289 million prescriptions were written for opioid drugs per year.

Mirroring the growth of opioid pain relievers prescribed is an increase in the admissions for substance abuse treatments and opioid-related deaths. This illustrates how legitimate clinical prescriptions of pain relievers are being diverted through an illegitimate market, leading to misuse, addiction, and death. With the increase in volume, the potency of opioids also increased. By 2002, one in six drug users were being prescribed drugs more powerful than morphine; by 2012, the ratio had doubled to one in three. The most commonly prescribed opioids have been oxycodone and hydrocodone.

The epidemic has been described as a "uniquely American problem". The structure of the US healthcare system, in which people not qualifying for government programs are required to obtain private insurance, favors prescribing drugs over more expensive therapies. According to Professor Judith Feinberg, "Most insurance, especially for poor people, won't pay for anything but a pill." Prescription rates for opioids in the US are 40 percent higher than the rate in other developed countries such as Germany or Canada. While the rates of opioid prescriptions increased between 2001 and 2010, the prescription of non-opioid pain relievers (aspirin, ibuprofen, etc.) decreased from 38% to 29% of ambulatory visits in the same time period, and there has been no change in the amount of pain reported in the U.S. This has led to differing medical opinions, with some noting that there is little evidence that opioids are effective for chronic pain not caused by cancer.

Women 
The opioid epidemic affects women and men differently. For instance, women are more likely than men to be prescribed prescription opioids and develop a substance use disorder. Women are also more likely to have chronic pain than men are.  In cases of domestic abuse and rape, women are prescribed pain medicine more than men. Along with that, during pregnancy women may use prescription opioids to help with pregnancy pain, especially with post-pregnancy pain. The number of women that have died from opioid pain relievers has increased 5 times from what it was in 1999 in 2010. To help stop the spread of opioid abuse in women, it is advised that women are educated on the drugs that they are taking and the possible risk of addiction. Additionally, alternatives should always be used when possible in order to prevent addiction.

Most research gone into understanding the epidemic is mostly focused on females, specifically anticipated mothers. Women are at the greatest risk for opioid addiction compared to men. Usually, opioid misuse in women stems from unused prescription drug hoarding, the dependence of the drugs and higher pain levels compared to men. Women are less likely to report opioid misuse in contrast to the male population. Analyzers of the epidemic stress that their main concern is the female victims, and studies tend to neglect the male population victimization, when over 70% of prescription drug intake and overdose, happen to males.

Adolescents 
Adolescents are another category of people that can become easily addicted to opioids. Even before their teenage years, children go through the rapid growth of their reward center, also known as the Mesolimbic pathway. The development of the Mesolimbic pathway allows children to be easily satisfied by small rewards to encourage learning, motivation, and acceptable behavior. However, this growth peaks in their adolescent years, and they start to feel a need for larger, more meaningful rewards, such as psychoactive substances which produce reward signals through direct receptor binding. Teens also have an underdeveloped prefrontal cortex which governs impulse control and decision making. The combination of underdeveloped prefrontal cortex and a rundown reward system can lead to adolescents with addictive seeking behaviors and higher susceptibility to the neurological changes developed in substance use disorder (SUD). The Centers for Disease Control and Prevention estimates that In 2018, over 53 million people aged 12 years and older in the United States, reported the misuse of prescription drugs.

A 2020 review of the opioid epidemic in pediatrics stated that there were 4,094 opioid overdose deaths in people ages 14–24 in 2017. Teens commonly use opioids as recreational drugs, instead of what they are supposed to be used for, pain management. Centers for Disease Control and Prevention says that for every opioid death of a teen there are 119 emergency visits and 22 treatment admissions related to opioid abuse. Half a million teenagers in 2014 were reported as non medically prescribed opioid users and a third of those as having a substance use disorder (SUD).

Family is widely discussed as an influence for factors affecting adolescent opioid misuse behavior and in the treatment of adolescent opioid misuse. Family involvement has been shown to be effective in decreasing substance use in adolescents by addressing family risk factors that may be contributing to an adolescent's substance use. Some of these risk factors that are contributing to the increase in popularity of opioids include easy accessibility. The late 1990s increase in opioid recommendation from pharmaceutical companies created an abundance of prescription painkillers in adult households. If family members are taking opioids for pain or have taken them in the past and did not dispose of them correctly or do not protect them properly, it can make it easy for adolescents to get their hands on them.

Proper disposal of these drugs is crucial to reducing adolescent misuse. A national insurance cohort reviewed almost 90,000 opioid prescribed patients, 13–21 years old, and found that 5% continued to fill their prescription 90 days or more after surgery. Medicine take-back programs are the most recommended and regulated disposal method by the United States Drug Enforcement Agency, although, it is not guaranteed that the prescribed patient will comply with this recommendation. There are also eight different at-home drug disposal products on the market but none of them is federal agency approved or in the process of being evaluated. The main concern of proper opioid disposal is trash and sewage disposal that create pharmaceutical pollution and still grants access for adolescents with substance use disorders.

Not only are youth at a heightened risk of developing opioid addictions, but treating opioid use disorder in this population is also more difficult than it is for older individuals. A systematic review of the epidemiological literature has found that adolescents and young adults consistently have shorter retention times in medication treatments for opioid use disorder than do older adults. This is why it is important for schools to implement effective strategies and programs to teach young children about the dangers and consequences of opioid misuse. Although the retention time of adolescents is much lower than adults, educating them from a younger age on opioid misuse should help keep children away from these drugs.

Limited treatment 
The continued prevalence of the opioid epidemic in the United States can be traced to many reasons. For one, there is a lack of appropriate treatments and treatment centers across the nation. Big cities like New York City are lacking in treatment services and health offices as well as small rural areas. Another reason the opioid epidemic is hard to combat is due to available housing being limited to recovering addicts. Having limited housing makes it easy for recovering substance users to return to the environments and relationships that promoted drug misuse in the first place. Along with housing, jobs for recovering addicts can be difficult to find. Individuals with substance use disorders that have criminal records have a more difficult time finding jobs once they leave recovery. Having to combat job insecurity can lead to stress, which can cause someone to relapse. The fact that "wraparound services", or programs that provide services for patients who have just come out of rehabilitation centers or programs, are rare to non-existent, and is also a contributing reason as to why the opioid epidemic has gone on for so long.

Public policy response 
The public reaction that has made the first step in ending the opioid epidemic was the lawsuit that the state of Oklahoma put up against Purdue Pharma. The state of Oklahoma argued that Purdue Pharma helped start the opioid epidemic because of assertive marketing and deceptive claims on the dangers of addiction. One of the marketing strategies was to redefine "substance use disorder" as "pseudo addiction". In 2019, Purdue Pharma agreed to settle and pay 270 million dollars to the state of Oklahoma that would go towards addiction research and treatment. The settlement could indicate a win for other states that have taken legal action against similar opioid manufacturers. Specifically, states like California are raising similar claims that Purdue Pharma marketed the drug Oxycontin as a safe and effective treatment, which led to the opioid crisis leaving thousands dead in California from opioid overdoses.

Treatment within Legal Landscape 
Title II of the Comprehensive Drug Abuse Prevention and Control Act of 1970, otherwise known as the Controlled Substance Act, established five drug schedules to regulate and control their manufacture and distribution. In 2017, President Donald Trump officially declared the opioid crisis a "public health emergency." In 2018, the United States federal government enacted the SUPPORT Act which aims to help Americans gain access to opioid addiction treatment and help and reduce the amount of opioids prescribed. Other efforts include enacting legislation that provides funds from the Department of Health and Human Services to help support the creation and use of Syringe Services Programs. Recently, legislatures have started to advocate for the implementation of supervised injection sites as another way to help the opioid crisis and reduce harm. However, the United States Court of Appeals for the Third Circuit held that supervised injection cites violate the Federal Crack House Statute.

Canada
In 1993, an investigation by the chief coroner in British Columbia identified an "inordinately high number" of drug-related deaths, of which there were 330. By 2017, there were 1,473 deaths in British Columbia and 3,996 deaths in Canada as a whole.

Following the United States, Canada was identified in 2015 as the second-highest per-capita user of prescription opioids. In Alberta, emergency department visits as a result of opiate overdose, attributable to both prescription and illicit opioids, specifically fentanyl and fentanyl analogues, rose 1,000% in the previous five years. The Canadian Institute for Health Information found that while a third of overdoses were intentional overall, among those ages 15–24 nearly half were intentional. In 2017, there were 3,987 opioid-related deaths in Canada, 92% of these deaths being unintentional. The number of deaths involving fentanyl or fentanyl analogues increased by 17% compared to 2016. Between April and December 2020, there was an 89% increase in opioid related deaths in comparison to 2019.  Saskatoon, Saskatchewan experienced a record month in opioid overdoses in May 2020 caused, authorities explained, by a combination of ever-amplifying toxic drugs and the COVID-19 pandemic's quarantine keeping individuals from family and needed mental health services. Over 28,800 Emergency Medical Services (EMS) responded to possible opioid related health crises between January and December 2020 after the COVID-19 Pandemic began. In May 2020 Medavie Health Services provided over 250 ambulance services for overdoses, administering the opioid antagonist nasal spray Narcan (naloxone) in record numbers.

North America's first safe injection site, Insite, opened in the Downtown Eastside (DTES) neighborhood of Vancouver in 2003. Safe injection sites are legally sanctioned, medically supervised facilities in which individuals are able to consume illicit recreational drugs, as part of a harm reduction approach towards drug problems which also includes information about drugs and basic health care, counseling, sterile injection equipment, treatment referrals, and access to medical staff, for instance in the event of an overdose. Health Canada has licensed 16 safe injection sites in the country. In Canada, about half of overdoses resulting in hospitalization were accidental, while a third were deliberate overdoses.

OxyContin was removed from the Canadian drug formulary in 2012 and medical opioid prescription was reduced, but this led to an increase in the illicit supply of stronger and more dangerous opioids such as fentanyl and carfentanil.  In 2018, there were around 1 million users at risk from these toxic opioid products. In Vancouver Dr. Jane Buxton of the British Columbia Centre for Disease Control joined the Take-home naloxone program in 2012 to provide at risk individuals medication that quickly reverses the effects of an overdose from opioids.

Outside North America 
Approximately 80 percent of the global pharmaceutical opioid supply is consumed in the United States. It has also become a serious problem outside the U.S., mostly among young adults. The concern not only relates to the drugs themselves, but to the fact that in many countries doctors are less trained about drug addiction, both about its causes or treatment. According to an epidemiologist at Columbia University: "Once pharmaceuticals start targeting other countries and make people feel like opioids are safe, we might see a spike [in opioid abuse]. It worked here. Why wouldn't it work elsewhere?"

Many deaths worldwide from opioids and prescription drugs are from sexually transmitted infections passed through shared needles. This has led to a global initiative of needle exchange programs and research into the varying needle types carrying STIs. In Europe, prescription opioids account for three‐quarter of overdose deaths, which represent 3.5% of total deaths among 15-39-year-olds. Some worry that the epidemic could become a worldwide pandemic if not curtailed. Prescription drug abuse among teenagers in Canada, Australia, and Europe were comparable to U.S. teenagers. In Lebanon and Saudi Arabia, and in parts of China, surveys found that one in ten students had used prescription painkillers for non-medical purposes. Similar high rates of non-medical use were found among the young throughout Europe, including Spain and the United Kingdom. In 2017, 1049 people had a death related to opioids in Spain

While strong opiates are heavily regulated within the European Union, there is a "hidden addiction" with codeine. Codeine, though a mild painkiller, is converted into morphine in the liver. "It's a hidden addiction,' said Dr Michael Bergin of Waterford Institute of Technology, Ireland. 'Codeine abuse affects people with diverse profiles, from children to older people across all social classes."

Myanmar 
On 18 May 2020, Myanmar and the U.N. Office of Drugs and Crime (UNODC) announced that, over the previous three months, police had confiscated illicit drugs with a street value estimated at hundreds of millions of dollars. Most was methamphetamine; they also seized 3,750 liters (990 gallons) of liquid methylfentanyl that can be used to manufacture a synthetic opioid.

United Kingdom
From January to August 2017, there were 60 fatal overdoses of fentanyl in the UK.  In England, opioid prescribing in general practice mirrors general geographical health inequalities.  In July 2019, two Surrey GPs  working for a Farnham-based online pharmacy were suspended by the General Medical Council for prescribing opioids online without appropriate safeguards.  Public Health England reported in September 2019 that half the patients using strong painkillers, antidepressants and sleeping tablets had been on them for more than a year, which was generally longer than was "clinically" appropriate and where the risks could outweigh the benefits.  They found that problems in the UK were less than in most comparable countries,  but there were 4,359 deaths related to drug poisoning, largely opioids, in England and Wales in 2018 – the highest number recorded since 1993.

Public Health England reported in September 2019 that 11.5 million adults in England had been prescribed benzodiazepines, Z-drugs, gabapentinoids, opioids, or antidepressants in the year ending March 2018.  Half of these had been prescribed for at least a year. About 540,000 had been prescribed opioids continuously for three years or more.  Prescribing of opioids and Z-drugs had decreased, but antidepressants and gabapentinoids had increased, gabapentinoids by 19% between 2015 and 2018 to around 1.5 million.

It was reported that in 2021/2022, 1.80 million patients were prescribed dependency-forming medicines in the most deprived areas in England,  1.66 times more than the number prescribed these medicines in the least deprived areas.  This pattern had been consistent since 2015/2016.

Continental Europe
While deaths from overdoses related to illicit fentanyl and oxycodone are relatively rare in the UK and Europe, fatal outcomes from opioid intoxications have seen a moderate increase since 2015. In continental Europe, the rise of deaths as a result of opioid/opiate use had been partly due to chronic illnesses of addicts 40 years and older, but some of the recent deaths experienced by younger users experimenting with 'designer drugs' have been more unsettling. Generally speaking, the use of fentanyl by addicts in Europe has been rare as of 2022, according to a Swiss study, but at the same time general deaths from opioid use have increased by 177% since 2019. As in other parts of the Western world, the Covid-19 pandemic has brought a reduced availability of therapies for addicts, but at the same time increased the availability of synthetic opioids on the black market.

Accessibility of prescribed opioids

The worry surrounding the potential of a worldwide pandemic has affected opioid accessibility in countries around the world. Approximately 25.5 million people per year, including 2.5 million children, die without pain relief worldwide, with many of these cases occurring in low and middle-income countries. The current disparity in accessibility to pain relief in various countries is significant. The U.S. produces or imports 30 times as much pain relief medication as it needs while low-income countries such as Nigeria receive less than 0.2% of what they need, and 90% of all the morphine in the world is used by the world's richest 10%.

America's opioid epidemic has resulted in an "opiophobia" that is stirring conversations among some Western legislators and philanthropists about adopting a "war on drugs rhetoric" to oppose the idea of increasing opioid accessibility in other countries, in fear of starting similar opioid epidemics abroad. The International Narcotics Control Board (INCB), a monitoring agency established by the U.N. to prevent addiction and ensure appropriate opioid availability for medical use, has written model laws limiting opioid accessibility that it encourages countries to enact. Many of these laws more significantly impact low-income countries; for instance, one model law ruled that only doctors could supply opioids, which limited opioid accessibility in poorer countries that had a scarce number of doctors.

In 2018, deputy head of China's National Narcotics Commission Liu Yuejin criticized the U.S. market's role in driving opioid demand.

In 2016, the medical news site STAT reported that while Mexican cartels are the main source of heroin smuggled into the U.S., Chinese suppliers provide both raw fentanyl and the machinery necessary for its production. In British Columbia, police discovered a lab making 100,000 fentanyl pills each month, which they were shipping to Calgary, Alberta. 90 people in Calgary overdosed on the drug in 2015. In Southern California, a home-operated drug lab with six pill presses was uncovered by federal agents; each machine was capable of producing thousands of pills an hour.

In 2018, a woman died in London after getting a prescription for tramadol from an online doctor based in Prague who had not considered her medical history.  Regulators in the UK admitted that there was nothing they could do to stop this from happening again. A reporter from The Times was able to buy opioids from five online pharmacies in September 2019 without any contact with their GP by filling in an online questionnaire and sending a photocopy of their passport.

Alternative for opioids 
Alternative drug options for opioids include over the counter pain medication such as Ibuprofen, Tylenol, and Aspirin or steroid options. Along with drug alternatives, many other alternatives can provide relief through physical activities.  Physical therapy, acupuncture, injections, nerve blocks, massages, and relaxation techniques are physical activities that have been found to help with chronic pain. New pain management drugs like marijuana and cannabinoids have also been found to help treat symptoms of pain. Many treatments like cancer treatments are using these drugs to help manage pain.

Signs of addiction 

People that are addicted to opioids can have many changes in behavior. Some of the common signs or symptoms of addiction include spending more time alone, losing interest in activities, quickly changing moods, sleeping at odd hours, getting in trouble with the law, and financial hardships. People that notice any of these behaviors in a peer or in oneself, are usually advised to consult a physician.

Treatment and prevention of addiction 
Opioid use disorder can be treated in a number of different ways: Medication assisted treatment pathways offer methadone, Suboxone (Buprenorphine/naloxone) and Vivitrol (naltrexone).
Cognitive behavioral therapies and counseling are proven effective, as well as digital care programs to increase abstinence rates.

A number of methods for the prevention of opioid addiction have been used and suggested. One method is the creation of anti-opioid advertisements. In the 1990s, advertisements depicting drug-seeking people purposefully slamming their arms into doors and crashing their cars, were unsuccessfully targeted at teens.

These ads were unsuccessful because they emphasized the risk of danger, pain, and death caused by opioids. While this tactic would make adults acknowledge the risks and stop using opioids, teenagers need to see that executives just use them as interchangeable customers. The makers of these ads feel that since the internet allows teenagers to view gruesome things anyway, it is perfectly acceptable to subject them to images of self-mutilation in order to protect their lives. It is felt that thirty seconds of gruesomeness is a small price to pay for sparing a lifetime (however short) of opioid abuse and its accompanying poverty and crime. These advertisements, which started in the 1980s, are continuing to play on television today, utilizing donated advertisement time. The goals of the most recent advertisements are to show teenagers that addiction can begin after only five days and that feeding this addiction can consume a person's entire life.

See also 
 Diseases of despair – including opioid overdose

References

Further reading
 Pryma, Jane. 2022. "Technologies of Expertise: Opioids and Pain Management's Credibility Crisis." American Sociological Review.